N-acetylmuramoyl-L-alanyl-D-glutamyl-L-lysyl-(N6-glycyl)-D-alanyl-D-alanine-diphosphoundecaprenyl-N-acetylglucosamine:glycine glycyltransferase (femA (gene)) is an enzyme with systematic name N-acetylmuramoyl-L-alanyl-D-glutamyl-L-lysyl-(N6-glycyl)-D-alanyl-D-alanine-ditrans,octacis-diphosphoundecaprenyl-N-acetylglucosamine:glycine glycyltransferase. This enzyme catalyses the following chemical reaction

 N-acetylmuramoyl-L-alanyl-D-isoglutaminyl-L-lysyl-(N6-glycyl)-D-alanyl-D-alanine-diphospho-ditrans,octacis-undecaprenyl-N-acetylglucosamine + 2 glycyl-tRNA  N-acetylmuramoyl-L-alanyl-D-isoglutaminyl-L-lysyl-(N6-triglycyl)-D-alanyl-D-alanine-diphospho-ditrans,octacis-undecaprenyl-N-acetylglucosamine + 2 tRNA

This enzyme catalyses the successive transfer of two glycine moieties from charged tRNAs to N-acetylmuramoyl-L-alanyl-D-isoglutaminyl-L-lysyl-(N6-glycyl)-D-alanyl-D-alanine-diphosphoundecaprenyl-N-acetylglucosamine.

References

External links 
 

EC 2.3.2